Cold Spring Harbor is a hamlet and census-designated place (CDP) in the Town of Huntington, in Suffolk County, on the North Shore of Long Island in New York. As of the 2010 United States census, the CDP population was 5,070.

History

Cold Spring Harbor was named after the naturally cold freshwater springs that flow in the area. Its economy mainly tied to milling and port activities, it rose in prominence as a whaling community in the mid-nineteenth century. After the decline of whaling in the 1860s, it became a resort town with several hotels. In the 20th century it became known as the site of Cold Spring Harbor Laboratory, although the laboratory itself is located in the adjacent village of Laurel Hollow in Nassau County, which was called Cold Spring before incorporation.

Today it is primarily a bedroom community of New York City, with a small central business area running along Route 25A, and is home to many educational and cultural organizations: the Cold Spring Harbor Whaling Museum, the Cold Spring Harbor Fish Hatchery and Aquarium (also in Laurel Hollow), Dolan DNA Learning Center, the Uplands Farm Sanctuary (home of The Nature Conservancy's Long Island chapter), and a museum exhibition gallery run by Preservation Long Island.

Geography

Demographics

As of the census of 2000, there were 4,975 people, 1,753 households, and 1,416 families residing in the CDP. The population density was 1,336.3 per square mile (516.4/km2). There were 1,790 housing units at an average density of 480.8/sq mi (185.8/km2). The racial makeup of the CDP was 97.03% White, 0.42% African American, 0.02% Native American, 1.31% Asian, 0.24% from other races, and 0.98% from two or more races. Hispanic or Latino of any race were 1.97% of the population.

There were 1,753 households, out of which 38.8% had children under the age of 18 living with them, 71.8% were married couples living together, 7.1% had a female householder with no husband present, and 19.2% were non-families. 14.9% of all households were made up of individuals, and 5.8% had someone living alone who was 65 years of age or older. The average household size was 2.84 and the average family size was 3.15.

In the CDP, the population was spread out, with 26.7% under the age of 18, 4.2% from 18 to 24, 28.9% from 25 to 44, 26.9% from 45 to 64, and 13.4% who were 65 years of age or older. The median age was 40 years. For every 100 females, there were 94.9 males. For every 100 females age 18 and over, there were 92.1 males.

The median income for a household in the CDP was $101,122, and the median income for a family was $112,441. Males had a median income of $78,984 versus $44,464 for females. The per capita income for the CDP was $52,403. About 1.3% of families and 2.2% of the population were below the poverty line, including 0.4% of those under age 18 and 3.6% of those age 65 or over.

Human Resources

Education
Cold Spring Harbor is primarily served by the Cold Spring Harbor School District, and in parts by the Huntington Union Free School District.

Libraries
Residents of Cold Spring Harbor fall into one of two library districts, Cold Spring Harbor and Huntington, each of which correspond to their respective school district.

Transportation
Cold Spring Harbor is served by the Cold Spring Harbor LIRR Station which is outside the hamlet in the neighboring hamlet of West Hills.

Notable people
 Al Arbour lived in Cold Spring Harbor during his coaching career with the New York Islanders. He moved in 1999, some years after his retirement
 James L. Dolan, Cablevision CEO, graduated in 1974 from Cold Spring Harbor High School.
 Sean Hannity, Fox News host
 Nouria Hernandez, rector of the University of Lausanne (Switzerland) was a professor at the Cold Spring Harbor Laboratory.
 Rosalie Gardiner Jones, suffragette
 John Lennon, musician
 Barbara McClintock, Nobel Prize winner for the discovery of gene transposition, worked at the Cold Spring Harbor Laboratory for many years and grew corn for research purposes in Cold Spring Harbor.
 Scott Seiver, World Series of Poker bracelet winner and former world number one poker player, as ranked by the Global Poker Index
 Alex Foxen, World Series of Poker bracelet winner and 2019 Global Poker Index player of the year. Considered to be one of the best poker players in the world today.
 Kathleen Sullivan, a leading scholar in American constitutional law and Professor at Stanford Law School, was valedictorian at her graduation from Cold Spring Harbor High School in 1972
 Wally Szczerbiak, retired NBA basketball player, attended Cold Spring Harbor High School
 Evan Thomas, journalist, editor and author, grew up in Cold Spring Harbor.
 Norman Thomas, socialist, pacifist, and six-time United States presidential candidate for the Socialist Party of America, lived in Cold Spring Harbor until his death in 1968.
 Randall Tolson, craftsman and clockmaker, known for a series of highly collectible memorial clocks, lived in Cold Spring Harbor until he died in 1954.
 Ryan Vesce, player for the San Jose Sharks in the NHL, grew up in Lloyd Harbor, adjacent to Cold Spring Harbor, and attended Cold Spring Harbor High School.
 James Watson, Nobel Prize winner, co-discoverer of the structure of DNA, and former Chancellor of the Cold Spring Harbor Laboratory
 Meg Whitman, former CEO of Hewlett-Packard and eBay, grew up in Lloyd Harbor and attended Cold Spring Harbor High School, graduating in 1973.

In popular culture 
 The novel Cold Spring Harbor (1986), by Richard Yates, is a quiet suburban tragedy set in the 1940s.
 In the Godzilla: The Series episode "Lizard Season", Cold Spring Harbor was used as the setting of the final battle between Godzilla and the Lizard Slayers, a trio of robots developed by the series' recurring villain Cameron Winter.
 Cold Spring Harbor is the name of Billy Joel's debut solo album from 1971 and is referenced in the song "Everybody Loves You Now": "You ain't got the time to go to Cold Spring Harbor no more." The album's cover has Joel in the hamlet. He would go on to purchase a house in the adjacent village of Lloyd Harbor with his then-wife Christie Brinkley in 1981.

See also 
 Cold Spring Harbor Laboratory
 Cold Spring Harbor (LIRR station)
 Cold Spring Harbor Whaling Museum
 Dolan DNA Learning Center
 AccuVein

References

External links

 Cold Spring Harbor Village
 Cold Spring Harbor High School

Huntington, New York
Census-designated places in New York (state)
Hamlets in New York (state)
Long Island Sound
Populated coastal places in New York (state)
Census-designated places in Suffolk County, New York
Hamlets in Suffolk County, New York